Nikolova may refer to:
The feminine of the Bulgarian surname Nikolov
12386 Nikolova, a Main-belt Asteroid